Reinhard Gruber (born 23 June 1977) was an Italian luger who has competed since the late 1990s. A natural track luger, he won the men's singles gold medal at the 1998 FIL World Luge Natural Track Championships in Rautavaara, Finland.

Gruber won a gold medal in the same event at the 1997 FIL European Luge Natural Track Championships in Moos in Passeier, Italy.

References
FIL-Luge profile
Natural track European Championships results 1970-2006.
Natural track World Championships results: 1979-2007

External links
 

1977 births
Living people
Italian lugers
Italian male lugers
People from Klausen, South Tyrol
Sportspeople from Südtirol